A group of three suicide attackers rammed a truck bomb into the wall of the German consulate in Mazar-i-Sharif, Afghanistan on 10 November 2016. Six people were killed (as well as two of the bombers) and more than 120 others were injured, while the sole remaining attacker was captured by Afghan security forces. The Taliban claimed responsibility for the attack and Taliban spokesman Zabihullah Mujahid said the bombing was in retaliation for an airstrike in Kunduz that killed 30 civilians the week before.

Event
At about 23:05 local time, a suicide bomber rammed a truck into the side of the German consulate. The truck exploded, killing six people and injuring dozens of others. A shooting was also initially reported but was later reported to be from German soldiers firing warning shots to keep people away from the area.

The Resolute Support Mission troops were deployed to the scene to investigate. It is possible that two bombs were involved as the damage to the consulate was so extensive that it is unlikely one bomb could have caused it.

References

2016 murders in Afghanistan
Attacks on diplomatic missions in Afghanistan
Attacks on diplomatic missions of Germany
Mazar-i-Sharif
November 2016 crimes in Asia
November 2016 events in Afghanistan
Suicide car and truck bombings in Afghanistan
Taliban attacks
Mass murder in 2016
Terrorist incidents in Afghanistan in 2016
Afghanistan–Germany relations
History of Balkh Province
Building bombings in Afghanistan
Attacks in Afghanistan in 2016